Hilda Barbro Hjalmarsson (10 December 1919 in Närke - 13 February 2012 in Degerfors) was a Swedish nurse, care teacher and inventor.

Biography 
Barbro Hjalmarsson invented the battery-powered blood cradle "Triomix", which automatically shakes a test tube with blood so that the blood cells are separated from the blood plasma correctly. Her invention saved both the time it took to turn each tube 10-12 times as well as increased quality in the test by avoiding human error. She was granted a patent in 1994 for this "Mixing apparatus comprising a mixing plate intended for receiving test tube tubes, which is imparted to a rocking movement of a certain frequency".  Her invention reduced the manual work and made the sampling safer.

References

Further reading

External links
Photo of Triomix

20th-century Swedish inventors
1919 births
2012 deaths
People from Närke
Swedish nurses
Swedish educators